"Pray" is a song by British singer Tina Cousins. It was written by Mark Topham and Karl Twigg and released on 2 November 1998 as the lead single from her debut album, Killing Time (1999). The song was her second consecutive top-20 hit in the United Kingdom and her first top-10 hit in Australia, where it achieved gold status. In Europe, "Pray" also reached the top 10 in Finland and Scotland, and it peaked at number 48 on the Eurochart Hot 100 in November 1998.

Critical reception
AllMusic editor MacKenzie Wilson remarked that the high-tempo R&B sounds on "Pray" "are so energetic and exciting, the club/dance scene can only be heightened". Michael Paoletta from Billboard complimented it as a "hugely anthemic single". Talia Jackson from Dayton Daily News felt that on the "Gothic-style track, she appeals for salvation while a futuristic cadence creates a compelling sound." Chuck Campbell from Knoxville News Sentinel said "it's hard to escape the overwhelming hope and positivity of the histrionic first single", "Pray". Pan-European magazine Music & Media wrote, "Ms. Cousins' first real claim to fame was her presence on Sash!'s huge hit "Mysterious Times" earlier this year. With this effort, she proves that she is perfectly capable of going it alone. This song is well suited to a fairly broad range of formats, and should do well on the dancefloor as well."

Chart performance
"Pray" was a notable hit on the charts in several countries. In Europe, it entered the top-10 in Finland (10) and Scotland (9), and the top-20 in Belgium (12), Spain (13) and the United Kingdom. In the latter, the single peaked at number 20 in its first week at the UK Singles Chart, on 15 November 1998. But on the UK Indie Chart, it was a even bigger hit, reaching number five. Additionally, "Pray" was a top-30 hit in Sweden (23), a top-40 hit in the Netherlands (29) and a top-50 hit on the Eurochart Hot 100, where it reached number 48 in November 1998. Outside Europe, it was very successful in Australia, where it hit number eight, while in New Zealand, it went to number 48. "Pray" was awarded with a gold record in Australia, after 35,000 singles were sold.

Music video
A music video was produced to promote the single. It was filmed in the North East England town of Whitley Bay. It features scenes shot in the town's Spanish City leisure complex which was by the late 1990s past its heyday and only a few years away from partial demolition and dereliction. Other scenes are staged in St Mary's Lighthouse, around its island, along the coast and in a terraced back street at the rear of Whitley Bay Baptist Church.

Track listings

 UK CD single
 "Pray" (radio edit) – 3:55
 "Pray" (W.I.P. In the Church Mix) – 7:06
 "Pray" (original version) – 4:23

 UK 12-inch single
A1. "Pray" (W.I.P. In the Church Mix) – 7:06
B1. "Pray" (W.I.P. In the Church Dub) – 6:00
B2. "Pray" (original version) – 4:23

 UK cassette single
 "Pray" (radio edit) – 3:55
 "Pray" (W.I.P. In the Church Mix) – 7:06

 European CD single
 "Pray" (radio edit) – 3:55
 "Pray" (original version) – 4:23

 Australian CD single
 "Pray" (radio edit) – 3:55
 "Pray" (Goodyear and Leal radio edit) – 3:59
 "Angel" (Fishead radio edit) – 4:12
 "Angel" (Tall Paul Mix) – 7:00
 "Pray" (W.I.P. In the Church Mix) – 7:06
 "Pray" (Goodyear and Leal Remix) – 8:00

Charts

Weekly charts

Year-end charts

Certifications

Release history

References

External links
 

Tina Cousins songs
1998 singles
1998 songs
Jive Records singles
Republic Records singles
Songs written by Karl Twigg
Songs written by Mark Topham